South Australia is one of Australia's states, and has established several state symbols and emblems.

Official symbols

See also
 List of symbols of states and territories of Australia
 Australian state colours

References

 Insignia & Emblems of South Australia Retrieved 18 March 2018.